The twelfth election to Glamorgan County Council, south Wales, took place in March 1925. It was preceded by the 1922 election and followed by the 1928 election.

Overview of the Result
Having lost its majority at the 1922 elections, Labour regained control of the County Council by winning seven seats.

Boundary Changes
There were no boundary changes at this election.

Candidates
16 councillors were returned unopposed.

Of the eleven retiring aldermen, nine sought re-election. Seven of their number were returned unopposed; these included the chairman of the County Council, Daniel Daniels (Lib, Dulais Valley) after the sitting Labour councillor stood down in his favour.

Contested Elections
The pattern of contests was similar to 1922, although Labour contested some seats that it had not previously stood.

Three retiring aldermen faced opposition. Rev D.H. Williams (Lib, Barry) faced a Labour opponent and the seat had been held by Labour since a 1919 by-election. W.H. Davies (Lab, Gower) faced an Independent opponent and in Caerphilly the sitting Independent stood down in favour of Joseph Howells though he faced a Labour challenge.

Outcome
Labour gained seven seats and lost only one, establishing a firm majority on the County Council.

Results

Aberaman
Rose Davies captured a seat previously held by a Liberal and became the first woman elected to the County Council.

Aberavon

Abercynon

Aberdare Town

Bargoed

Barry
Alderman D.H. Williams, chair of the Central Welsh Board of Education, comfortably won the seat but this was technically a Liberal gain from Labour who had held the seat since a by-election after Williams was re-elected as alderman in 1919.

Barry Dock

Blaengwawr

Bridgend

Briton Ferry

Cadoxton

Caerphilly
Alderman Joseph Howells won the seat after the sitting Independent councillor withdrew in his favour.

Cilfynydd

Coedffranc
W.T. Jenkins had previously stood as an Independent but now declared himself a Labour supporter.

Cowbridge

Cwm Aber

Cwmavon

Cymmer

Dinas Powys

Dulais Valley
Alderman Daniel Daniels of Crynant, chairman of the County Council, was returned unopposed after the sitting Labour councillor did not contest the seat. This was technically a Liberal gain.

Ferndale

Gadlys

Glyncorrwg

Gower

Hengoed

Hopkinstown

Kibbor
Henry Lewis again returned after many years.

Llandaff

Llandeilo Talybont

Llanfabon

Llwydcoed

Llwynypia and Clydach
James Evans, grocer, elected following Richard Lewis's election as alderman in 1901, was returned unopposed.

Loughor
The sitting member had been elected as a Liberal in 1922.

Maesteg, Caerau and Nantyffyllon

Maesteg, East and West

Mountain Ash

Neath (North)

Neath (South)

Newcastle

Ogmore Valley

Penarth North

Penarth South

Pencoed

Penrhiwceiber

Pentre

Pontardawe

Pontyclun

Port Talbot East

Port Talbot West

Porthcawl

Pontlottyn

Pontycymmer

Pontypridd

Penygraig

Porth

Swansea Valley

Tonyrefail and Gilfach Goch

Treforest

Treforest
The sitting member had been elected as a Liberal in 1922.

Treherbert
Enoch Davies, returned in 1901 following William Morgan's re-election as alderman, was elected unopposed.

Treorchy
Thomas Jones, Co-operative stores manager, was returned unopposed.

Tylorstown

Vale of Neath

Ynyshir

Ystalyfera
D.W. Davies regained the seat he lost three years previously.

Ystrad

Election of Aldermen
In addition to the 66 councillors the council consisted of 22 county aldermen. Aldermen were elected by the council, and served a six-year term. Following the 1925 election, there were eleven Aldermanic vacancies, all of which were filled by Labour nominees (including one long-serving Liberal). These included the first woman elected to the Council, Rose Davies (Aberaman).

The following retiring aldermen were re-elected:
E.H. Fleming (Lab, Hopkinstown)
William Jenkins (Lab, Glyncorrwg)
David Lewis (Lab, Tylorstown)
Rev D.H. Williams (Lib, Barry)

In addition, the following seven new aldermen were elected:

David Daniel Davies (Lab, Pontardawe)
Rose Davies (Lab, Aberaman)
John Evans (Lan, Maesteg)
Johnson Dicks (Lab, Abercynon)
Caradoc Jones (Lab, Llandeilo Talybont)
John Phillips (Lab, Llanfabon)
John Thomas (Lab, Port Talbot)

The following retiring aldermen were re-elected as members of the Council but were not re-elected as aldermen:
Llewellyn David (Ind, Port Talbot)
Daniel Daniels (Lib, Dulais Valley)
Joseph Howells (Lib, Caerphilly)
William Thomas (Lib, Aberdare)

By-elections
Eleven vacancies were caused by the election of aldermen.

Aberaman by-election

Abercynon by-election

Barry by-election

Glyncorrwg by-election

Hopkinstown by-election

Llandeilo Talybont by-election

Llanfabon by-election

Maesteg by-election

Pontardawe by-election

Port Talbot by-election

Tylorstown by-election

References

Bibliography

1925
1925 Welsh local elections
1920s in Glamorgan